The 1964 Detroit Tigers season was a season in American baseball. The team finished fourth in the American League with a record of 85–77, 14 games behind the New York Yankees.

Offseason 
 December 2, 1963: Howie Koplitz was drafted from the Tigers by the Washington Senators in the 1963 rule 5 draft.
 December 5, 1963: Gus Triandos and Jim Bunning were traded by the Tigers to the Philadelphia Phillies for Don Demeter and Jack Hamilton.
 March 18, 1964: Don Mossi was purchased from the Tigers by the Chicago White Sox.

Regular season

Season standings

Record vs. opponents

Notable transitions 
Andy Kosco was released by the Tigers on June 3, 1964. On September 16, 1964, Dick Drago was signed as an amateur free agent.
After playing in 106 games during his fourth season with the Tigers, outfielder Bill Bruton retired.

Roster

Player stats

Batting

Starters by position 
Note: Pos = Position; G = Games played; AB = At bats; H = Hits; Avg. = Batting average; HR = Home runs; RBI = Runs batted in

Other batters 
Note: G = Games played; AB = At bats; H = Hits; Avg. = Batting average; HR = Home runs; RBI = Runs batted in

Pitching

Starting pitchers 
Note: G = Games pitched; IP = Innings pitched; W = Wins; L = Losses; ERA = Earned run average; SO = Strikeouts

Other pitchers 
Note: G = Games pitched; IP = Innings pitched; W = Wins; L = Losses; ERA = Earned run average; SO = Strikeouts

Relief pitchers 
Note: G = Games pitched; W = Wins; L = Losses; SV = Saves; ERA = Earned run average; SO = Strikeouts

Farm system

Notes

References 

1964 Detroit Tigers season at Baseball Reference

Detroit Tigers seasons
Detroit Tigers season
Detroit Tigers
1964 in Detroit